In Touch with Dr. Charles Stanley is a television series sponsored by In Touch Ministries in Atlanta, Georgia and hosted by Charles Stanley.

History
The series began airing in 1978. The show has been translated in 50 languages.

References

External links

 

1978 American television series debuts
1980s American television series
1990s American television series
2000s American television series
2010s American television series
2020s American television series
Trinity Broadcasting Network original programming